Sanjawi Tehsil (pronounced Sanzāwə́i locally) is an administrative subdivision (tehsil) of Ziarat District in the Balochistan province of Pakistan. The tehsil is administratively subdivided into five Union Councils and is headquartered at the city of Sanjawi.

Majority of the population belongs to Dummar tribe, a sub cast of Kakars. Along Dummars, other tribes settled are Tareen, Pechi, Zakhpel, Nasar, Dumars, Kharoti, Sayyeds and Andarh. Pashto is the lingua franca.
Wanetsi, a unique and archaic dialect of Pashto, is also spoken in the area by Wanetsi tribe of Tareens.

Towns
Sanjawi Tehsil consists of the following villages:

 Chelaiz Khalil
 Uzhlaiz  
 Regora
 Zara Sanzavi (old Sanjavi)
 Poi Shareef
 Aghbarg
 Bghaow
 Chawter (چوتېر)
 Tor Waam
 Lawangabad
 Sinn Gharra
 Arbusi
 Khrashang
 Lawang Abad 
 Tand Wani
 Asghara
 Petawo
 Pasra
 Bayya
 Nusk
 Givarri
 Jilga
 Thakary
 Maraty
 Inzargat 
 Narai Dag
 Shereen
 Ghunza
 Shinlaiz
 Ghairkhwa
 Sara Khaizai
 Oach Wany
 Kaazha 
 Kanderha 
 Salam 
 Androbai

Notable people
Arman Loni
Wranga Loni

References

Tehsils of Balochistan, Pakistan
Ziarat District